The 1911 Maryland Aggies football team was an American football team that represented Maryland Agricultural College (which became Maryland State College in 1916 and part of the University of Maryland in 1920) in the 1911 college football season. The Aggies compiled a 4–4–2 record and were outscored by their opponents, 72 to 37. Charley Donnelly coached the Aggies in their first eight games, compiling a 2–4–2 record; Curley Byrd took over as coach for the final two games, both victories.

Schedule

References

Maryland
Maryland Terrapins football seasons
Maryland Aggies football